This is a list of Qatari football transfers for the 2015 summer transfer window by club. Only transfers of clubs in the Qatar Stars League are included.

Players without a club may join one at any time, either during or in between transfer windows.

Qatar Stars League

Al Ahli

In:

Out:

Al Arabi

In:

Out:

Al Gharafa

In:

Out:

Al Kharaitiyat

In:

Out:

Al Khor

In:

Out:

Al Rayyan

In:

Out:

Al Sailiya

In:

Out:

Al Wakrah

In:

Out:

El Jaish

In:

Out:

Lekhwiya

In:

Out:

Mesaimeer

In:

Out:

Qatar SC

In:

Out:

Umm Salal

In:

Out:

References

Football transfers summer 2015
Football in Qatar
Lists of Qatari football transfers